KS Vive Handball Kielce SA, officially known for sponsorship reasons as Industria Kielce, is a professional men's handball club based in Kielce in southeastern Poland, founded in 1965 under the name Iskra Kielce. The club plays in the Polish Superliga and is a regular competitor of the EHF Champions League. The most successful Polish handball club based on the number of the league titles (19).

Since 1984, the club has been playing at the highest level league of Polish handball, winning its first title in 1993 (they finished the season with 44 points, 5 points more than one of their greatest contestants – Wisła Płock). 

In 2019, it has become the most successful handball club in Poland, winning its 16th title and therefore beating the previous record holder, Śląsk Wrocław.

In 2023, the team changed its name to Industria Kielce.

Throughout the years of its functioning, the club has managed to reach the final four of the Champions League five times, eventually winning the most prestigious handball competition in Europe in 2016.

Honours

Domestic
 Polish Superliga
Winners (19): 1992–93, 1993–94, 1995–96, 1997–98, 1998–99, 2002–03, 2008–09, 2009–10, 2011–12, 2012–13, 2013–14, 2014–15, 2015–16, 2016–17, 2018–19, 2019–20, 2020–21, 2021–22

 Polish Cup
Winners (17): 1984–85, 1999–2000, 2002–03, 2003–04, 2005–06, 2008–09, 2009–10, 2010–11, 2011–12, 2012–13, 2013–14, 2014–15, 2015–16, 2017–18, 2018–19, 2020–21

International
 EHF Champions League
Winners (1): 2015–16
Silver (1): 2021–22
Final four (3): 2012–13, 2014–15, 2018–19

 IHF Super Globe
Bronze (2): 2016, 2022

Season by season

European record

EHF Champions League

Team

Current squad
Squad for the 2022–23 season

Goalkeepers 
1  Mateusz Kornecki
 33  Andreas Wolff 
Left wingers
4  Miguel Sánchez-Migallón 
6  Szymon Wiaderny
 27  Cezary Surgiel 
 99  Dylan Nahi
Right wingers
7  Benoît Kounkoud
 23  Arkadiusz Moryto
Line players
 11  Nicolas Tournat 
 41  Damian Domagała
 50  Artsem Karalek

Left backs
9  Szymon Sićko
 30  Elliot Stenmalm
 48  Tomasz Gębala 
Centre backs
5  Michał Olejniczak
 18  Igor Karačić
 24  Daniel Dujshebaev
 25  Haukur Þrastarson 
Right backs
 10  Alex Dujshebaev 
 34  Paweł Paczkowski

Transfers
Transfers for the 2023–24 season

 Joining
  Sandro Meštrić (GK) (from  RD Riko Ribnica) 
  Hassan Kaddah (LB) (from  Zamalek SC)
  Doruk Pehlivan (LB) (back from loan at  GWD Minden)
  Piotr Jędraszczyk (CB) (from  Piotrkowianin Piotrków Trybunalski)
  Yoav Lumbroso (CB) (from  Limoges Handball) 

 Leaving

See also

References

External links
 Official website
 Official website 

Polish handball clubs
Sport in Kielce
Handball clubs established in 1965
1965 establishments in Poland